Poonch Haveli Assembly constituency is one of the 87 constituencies in the Jammu and Kashmir Legislative Assembly of Jammu and Kashmir a north state of India. Poonch Haveli is also part of Jammu constituency.

Members of Legislative Assembly

Election results

2014

2008

See also
 List of constituencies of Jammu and Kashmir Legislative Assembly

References

Assembly constituencies of Jammu and Kashmir
Poonch district, India